The Coleman–Weinberg model represents quantum electrodynamics of a scalar field in four-dimensions. The Lagrangian for the model is

where the scalar field is complex,  is the electromagnetic field tensor, and   the covariant derivative containing the electric charge  of the electromagnetic field.

Assume that  is nonnegative. Then if the mass term is tachyonic,  there is a spontaneous breaking of the gauge symmetry at low energies, a variant of the Higgs mechanism. On the other hand, if the squared mass is positive,  the vacuum expectation of the field  is zero. At the classical level the latter is true also if . However, as was shown by Sidney Coleman and Erick Weinberg, even if the renormalized mass is zero, spontaneous symmetry breaking still happens due to the radiative corrections (this introduces a mass scale into a classically conformal theory - model have a conformal anomaly).

The same can happen in other gauge theories. In the broken phase the fluctuations of the scalar field  will manifest themselves as a naturally light Higgs boson, as a matter of fact even too light to explain the electroweak symmetry breaking in the minimal model - much lighter than vector bosons. There are non-minimal models that give a more realistic scenarios. Also the variations of this mechanism were proposed for the hypothetical spontaneously broken symmetries including supersymmetry.

The model is the four-dimensional analog of the three-dimensional Ginzburg–Landau theory used to explain the properties of superconductors near the phase transition.

The three-dimensional version of the Coleman–Weinberg model governs the superconducting phase transition which can be both first- and second-order, depending on the ratio of the Ginzburg–Landau parameter , with a tricritical point near  which separates type I from type II superconductivity.
Historically, the order of the superconducting phase transition was debated for a long time since the temperature
interval where fluctuations are large (Ginzburg interval) is extremely small.
The question was finally settled
in 1982. If the  Ginzburg–Landau parameter  that distinguishes type-I and 
type-II superconductors (see also here)
is large enough, vortex fluctuations 
becomes important 
which drive the transition to second order.
The tricritical point lies at
roughly
, i.e., slightly below the value 
where type-I  goes over into type-II superconductor.
The prediction was confirmed in 2002 by Monte Carlo computer simulations.

Literature

See also 
 Quartic interaction

References 

Quantum field theory
Quantum mechanical potentials